Jenne Langhout (September 27, 1918 – March 29, 2010) was a Dutch field hockey player who competed in the 1948 Summer Olympics. He was born in Batavia, Dutch East Indies.

He was a member of the Dutch field hockey team, which won the bronze medal. He played all seven matches as halfback.

External links
 
Jenne Langhout's profile at databaseOlympics.com
Jenne Langhout's profile at Sports Reference.com
Jenne Langhout's obituary 

1918 births
2010 deaths
Dutch male field hockey players
Field hockey players at the 1948 Summer Olympics
Olympic bronze medalists for the Netherlands
Olympic field hockey players of the Netherlands
Olympic medalists in field hockey
People from Batavia, Dutch East Indies
Medalists at the 1948 Summer Olympics
20th-century Dutch people
21st-century Dutch people